Sir Paul Brierley Smith  (born 5 July 1946) is a British fashion designer. His reputation is founded on his designs for men's clothing, but his business has expanded into other areas as well. Smith was made a Royal Designer for Industry in 1991.

His eponymous fashion company was founded in 1970 and has expanded into over 70 countries, selling its products via standalone stores, departments in high-end stores or malls, along with airport terminals, as well as the e-commerce section of its international website. Some of his brand's stores are recognized for their uniqueness and eccentricity, including the much-photographed vibrant, fluorescent pink flagship store in Los Angeles.

Early life 

Smith was born in 1946 in Beeston, Nottinghamshire, England, the son of Harold Smith, and is the youngest of three children. One of his early ambitions was to become a professional cyclist. He left school at the age of 15 to work in a Nottingham clothing warehouse, while practising cycling outside of work hours. He cycled to and from work until the age of 17, when he was in a major cycling accident that put him in hospital for close to six months.  During his recovery, friends inspired him to enter the world of art and fashion. Smith has regularly referenced cycling in his work over the years.
He started to take classes in tailoring and eventually began working with a Savile Row tailor, Lincroft Kilgour.

Career 
Smith opened his own shop called Paul Smith Vêtements Pour Homme in Nottingham in 1970, which sold established clothing labels, alongside pieces that Smith had designed. The store was just 3 square metres and was located at 6 Byard Lane in Nottingham.

In 1976, Smith travelled to Paris to showcase his first men's collection, which featured a mix of casual and semi-formal wear. After that the Paul Smith brand continued to grow and he opened his flagship London store in 1979 on Floral Street in Covent Garden, London.

'Paul Smith Women', his first womenswear collection, was launched in 1993, after reports of women coming into his stores buying smaller sizes to wear themselves.

The first Japan store opened in Tokyo in 1984, growing over the years to 165 stores across the country.

Smith opened his first shop in New York on Fifth Avenue in 1987. The company now has four shops in the state, the flagship on Greene Street as well as Williamsburg, Bleecker Street and Brookfield Place.

In 1993, Smith took over 'workwear' clothing company R. Newbold (established in 1885) and incorporated many of their designs into his new collection.

His childrenswear collection started in 1990 with the launch of a one-off collection for boys, including casual and tailored pieces. In 2010, Smith launched 'Paul Smith Junior' as a seasonal collection which often included remakes of his adult collections.

In 1995, the Design Museum exhibited 'True Brit', a show marking 25 years of his business. The show then went on to Glasgow for the 'Festival of Design' and then moved to his hometown of Nottingham and was put on display in Nottingham Castle.

Smith published his first book, You Can Find Inspiration in Everything, in 2001.

The brand launched its e-commerce site in 2004.

In 2013, Smith designed and made a school tie for Beeston Fields Primary School in Nottingham.

In 2016, Smith's second book, Paul Smith's Cycling Scrapbook, was released: it documents a personal history of the sport he is very passionate about.

In January 2016, Smith combined his men's and women's fashion shows, showcasing during Paris Fashion Week.

In 2019, Smith made a cameo appearance in the film Men in Black: International; he also designed the suits in the film.

His company remains independent, the majority owned by Smith.

Awards 
Smith has won numerous awards over the years, including:

Freedom of the City of Nottingham, February 1997.
 Designer of the Year four years in a row at the GQ Men of the Year awards.
Along with Anya Hindmarch, the Condé Nast Traveller Innovation and Design Awards, in 2010.
 Outstanding Achievement Award, British Fashion Awards 2011.
 Honorary Fellowship of the British Institute of Interior Design.
 Named one of GQ's 50 best dressed British men in 2015.

Smith was appointed Commander of the Order of the British Empire (CBE) in the 1994 New Year Honours for services to fashion. He was knighted in the 2000 Birthday Honours and appointed Member of the Order of the Companions of Honour (CH) in the 2020 Birthday Honours for services to fashion.

Partnerships and other business pursuits
Smith has been involved in multiple collaborations and partnerships over the years, including:

1997 
Smith designed a Mini that was produced in a limited edition of 1,800 cars.

2002 
Smith worked with Italian furniture designer Cappellini to create a small homeware collection.

2003 
Smith's first collaboration with Maharam, the US textile brand, originally used in one of his suit designs; the two continue to work together on new ranges.

2005 
Smith teamed up with motorbike manufacturer Triumph, restyling the Bonneville T100 bike.

Smith redesigned the Lasonic i931 boombox, giving it a white look with Smith's trademark multicolour look.

For the 60th anniversary of Penguin Classics, Paul Smith was asked to choose and redesign one cover: he chose Lady Chatterley's Lover by DH Lawrence.

2006 
Smith and Mercian Cycles collaborated on a series of bicycles.

Smith designed the chairs in screen 4 at Broadway Cinema, Nottingham.

2007 
Smith began working with the UK-based boutique cycle clothing retailer, Rapha. Smith designed a range of cycle clothing in association with Rapha, including a jersey to celebrate the rare start of the Tour de France in London.

2009 
Smith was the third designer, following Jean-Paul Gaultier, to redesign a bottle for Evian water.

Paul Smith provided suits for the Manchester United team.

2010 
Smith worked with Burton Snowboards, including adding his signature stripe to boards and apparel.

2011 
Smith designed four limited edition prints to mark the release of Tinker, Tailor, Soldier, Spy.

2012 
Smith joined Leica to design a limited edition Leica X2 camera.

Curated by the Isle of Man Post Office, Smith designed a set of stamps to mark the launch of the London Olympics.

Smith joined boot-maker John Lobb to create a series of Oxford, derby and loafers.

2013 
Smith was the official designer of the T-shirt for the David Bowie album 'The Next Day'.

Smith designed the leaders' jersey for Giro d'Italia including the Maglia Rosa.

2014 
Smith started a collaboration with Anglepoise, reimagining their Type 75 lamp as Edition One; he has since gone on to creating multiple editions.

2015 
Smith designed a series of T-shirts in collaboration with the release of David Bowie's final album ★ (Blackstar).

Smith worked with Kask for the first time to design their 'Protone' aero helmet. In 2018 a second helmet was released.

The first collaboration between Paul Smith & Caran d'Ache launched 10 colours of their '849' pen. They went on to work together again in 2016.

2016 
Collaborated with the wine merchant Berry Bros & Rudd on a limited edition range of bottles.

Smith collaborated with Land Rover to design a bespoke Defender.

Smith designed a new version of the cactus-shaped coat stand by Italian furniture designers Gufram.

Edition Three of the Paul Smith & Anglepoise Collaboration was launched.

The second collaboration with Caran d'Ache was launched, adding 8 new colours to the collection.

2018 
For the 120th anniversary of Globe-Trotter, Smith collaborated with the company by redesigning their 20" trolley case; it was first showcased at the Salone del Mobile.

Celebrating 30 years of New Balance's 576 sneaker (trainer), Smith redesigned with his iconic stripe design, along with a series of footballs and football boot.

In tribute to his close friend Tony Gross, the company collaborated with Cutler & Gross on a limited edition collection of eyewear for his spring/summer 2019 show in Paris.

Smith worked with James Turner of Sports Purpose to cover a 1965 Porsche 911 with multicoloured stripes, which went on to compete at Le Mans Classic and Goodwood Festival of Speed.

2021 
Smith designed a Mini Electric using sustainable principles, with recycled and natural materials, for example cork. Smith's Mini Strip was designed to break "the unwritten law that even small cars have to be shiny, polished luxury products."

References

External links
 

1946 births
Articles containing video clips
Clothing brands of the United Kingdom
Commanders of the Order of the British Empire
English businesspeople in fashion
English chief executives
English fashion designers
Eyewear brands of the United Kingdom
Fashion accessory brands
High fashion brands
Knights Bachelor
Living people
Luxury brands
Members of the Order of the Companions of Honour
Menswear designers
People from Beeston, Nottinghamshire
Shoe brands